There are many relations among the uniform polyhedra.

Here they are grouped by the Wythoff symbol.

Key

Regular 

All the faces are identical, each edge is identical and each vertex is identical.
They all have a Wythoff symbol of the form p|q 2.

Convex 
The Platonic solids.

Non-convex 
The Kepler-Poinsot solids.

Quasi-regular 
Each edge is identical and each vertex is identical. There are two types of faces
which appear in an alternating fashion around each vertex.
The first row are semi-regular with 4 faces around each vertex. They have Wythoff symbol 2|p q.
The second row are ditrigonal with 6 faces around each vertex. They have Wythoff symbol 3|p q or 3/2|p q.

Wythoff p q|r

Truncated regular forms 
Each vertex has three faces surrounding it, two of which are identical. These all have Wythoff symbols 2 p|q, some are constructed by truncating the regular solids.

Hemipolyhedra 
The hemipolyhedra all have faces which pass through the origin. Their Wythoff symbols are of the form p p/m|q or p/m p/n|q. With the exception of the tetrahemihexahedron they occur in pairs, and are closely related to the semi-regular polyhedra, like the cuboctohedron.

Rhombic quasi-regular 
Four faces around the vertex in the pattern p.q.r.q. The name rhombic stems from inserting
a square in the cuboctahedron and icosidodecahedron. The Wythoff symbol is of the form p q|r.

Even-sided forms

Wythoff p q r| 
These have three different faces around each vertex, and the vertices do not lie on any plane of symmetry. They have Wythoff symbol p q r|, and vertex figures 2p.2q.2r.

Wythoff p q (r s)| 

Vertex figure p.q.-p.-q. Wythoff p q (r s)|, mixing pqr| and pqs|.

Snub polyhedra 

These have Wythoff symbol |p q r, and one non-Wythoffian construction is given |p q r s.

Wythoff |p q r

Wythoff |p q r s 

Polyhedra
Uniform polyhedra